Hackleman is a small unincorporated community in central Liberty Township, Grant County, Indiana.

History
Hackleman was named for Pleasant A. Hackleman, a Franklin County-born Union general who was killed during the American Civil War. A post office was established at Hackleman in 1871, and remained in operation until it was discontinued in 1902.

Geography

References

Unincorporated communities in Grant County, Indiana
Unincorporated communities in Indiana